is a Japanese manga artist. She made her professional debut with the short story , published in the March 10, 1995 issue of Hakusensha's Lunatic LaLa magazine. Prior to becoming a manga artist, Matsumoto was a nurse.

Works 

  (1996–2001)
 23:00 (2001–2002)
  (2002–2004)
  (2005–2006)
  (2006–2008)
  (2009)
  (2013–2018)
  (2014–2018)
  (2020–present)

References

External links 
 Interview in Comicate No. 59 in 2002 (defunct; link via the Wayback Machine) 
 

Japanese female comics artists
Living people
Manga artists from Osaka Prefecture
Women manga artists
Year of birth missing (living people)